Canilhac is a former commune in the Lozère department in southern France. On 1 January 2016, it was merged into the new commune of Banassac-Canilhac. Its population was 164 in 2013.

See also
Communes of the Lozère department

References

Former communes of Lozère